Matthew Delis Ritter is an American lawyer and Democratic politician from Connecticut. He is currently the Speaker of the Connecticut House of Representatives and represents the first district.

Personal life
Ritter was born in Hartford, Connecticut. His father Thomas D. Ritter is a lawyer, lobbyist, and career politician who rose to be the Speaker of the House of the Connecticut House of Representatives, his mother Christine E. Keller is a Judge. He attended Colby College from 2000 to 2004 and the University of Connecticut School of Law.

Business career
In 2007 Matthew Ritter took a job with Hartford law firm Shipman and Goodwin, LLP. He is a Partner specializing in public finance, municipal law and election law.

Political career
He spent three years on the Hartford City Council prior to his election to the State Assembly, while on the Council he chaired the Planning & Economic Development and Legislative Affairs committees. In 2010, Ritter defeated incumbent Kenneth Green in the Democratic primary 1,153 votes to 1,151 votes. He won election to the heavily Democratic 1st assembly district in a three-way race defeating Republican Kenneth Lerman and Connecticut for Lieberman candidate Emanuel L. Blake. Ritter became the Majority Leader of the Connecticut House of Representatives on January 9, 2013. In 2017, he defeated Republican challenger Ken Lerman 92% to 8%. Ritter is the Vice chair of the General Assembly's Legislative Management Committee.

References 

|-

21st-century American politicians
Colby College alumni
Connecticut lawyers
Lawyers from Hartford, Connecticut
Living people
Speakers
Speakers of the Connecticut House of Representatives
Politicians from Hartford, Connecticut
University of Connecticut School of Law alumni
Year of birth missing (living people)